Hájek (full name Hájek u Uhřiněvsi) is a cadastral district of Prague, Czech Republic. In 2015 it had 618 inhabitants.

References 

Districts of Prague